Bárbara M. Brizuela is an American mathematics educator, and an associate professor education at Tufts University.

Education and career
Brizuela was born in the United States, though raised in Argentina and Venezuela.
She has an Ed.D from Harvard University where she studied under Eleanor Duckworth. Prior to that, she received a Master of Arts, General Studies in Education from Tufts and a Licenciada en Ciencias Pedagógicas and Licenciada en Psicopedagogía degrees from the Universidad de Belgrano. She was a Spencer Fellow at the Harvard Graduate School of Education from 1997 until 2000 and a Roy E. Larsen Fellow in 1996–1997.

She is one of the leaders of the Tufts Math, Science, Technology and Engineering Education graduate research program.

In 2008, she received a Fulbright Fellowship.

Research
Brizuela's main research focus is on mathematics education in early childhood and elementary school. She mainly studies children's learning of written mathematical representations as well as children's construction of algebraic understandings in a line of work called "Early Algebra". She is a member of the Early Algebra Project, an NSF-funded longitudinal study of the effects of introducing some algebraic concepts to children in elementary school, and was the Principal Investigator of a study created to follow up the children of the Early Algebra study into middle and high school, also funded by the NSF.  She is also involved in the Noyce Teacher Fellowship Program at Tufts and in the research effort surrounding Tufts's Poincaré Institute for Mathematics Education, an NSF NSF MSP project.

Books
In 2004, her book Mathematical Development in Young Children: Exploring Notations was published. This book was later translated into Portuguese.

In 2007, she published the book Bringing Out the Algebraic Character of Arithmetic: From Children’s Ideas to Classroom Practice with her colleagues Analúcia Schliemann and David Carraher. This book was later translated into Spanish. She is also the author of Haciendo números: Las notaciones númericas vistas desde la psicología, la didáctica la historia (Editorial Paidós Mexicana, 2006)

With Brian E. Gravel she edited Show Me What You Know: Exploring Student Representations Across STEM Disciplines (Teachers College Press, 2013).

Selected journal articles 
 Schliemann, A.D., Carraher, D.W., & Brizuela, B. M. (2012, in press). "Algebra in Elementary School and its Impact on Middle School Learning."  Recherches en Didactique des Mathématiques, Paris, France.
 Caddle, M., & Brizuela, B. M.  (2011).  "Fifth Graders’ Additive And Multiplicative Reasoning: Establishing Connections Across Conceptual Fields Using A Graph."  Journal of Mathematical Behavior, 30(3), 224–234.
 Martinez, M. V., Brizuela, B. M., & Castro Superfine, A.  (2011).  "Integrating Algebra and Proof in High School Mathematics: An Exploratory Study".  Journal of Mathematical Behavior, 30, 30–47.
 Brizuela, B. M., & Alvarado, M.  (2010).  "First graders' work on additive problems with the use of different notational tools".  Revista IRICE Nueva Época, 21, 37–44.
 Brizuela, B. M., & Cayton, G. A.  (2010).  "Anotar números desde pre-escolar hasta segundo grado: el impacto del uso de dos sistemas de representación en la presentación".  Cultura & Educación, 22(2), 149–167.
 Brizuela, B. M., & Cayton, G.  (2008).  "The roles of punctuation marks while learning about written numbers".  Educational Studies in Mathematics, 68, 209–225.
 Brizuela, B. (2006). "Young Children's Notations For Fractions". Educational Studies in Mathematics, 62 (3), 281–305 
 Carraher, D. W., Schliemann, A. D., Brizuela, B. M., & Earnest, D.  (2006).  "Arithmetic and Algebra in Early Mathematics Education".  Journal for Research in Mathematics Education 37(2), 87–115. 
 Martinez, M. V., & Brizuela, B. M.  (2006).  "A third grader’s way of thinking about linear function tables".  Journal of Mathematical Behavior, 25(4), 285–298.
 Carraher, D.W., Schliemann, A.D., & Brizuela, B.M.  (2005).  "Treating the operations of arithmetic as functions".  [Videopaper].  In D. Carraher & R. Nemirovsky (Eds.), Medium and meaning: 
 Brizuela, B. M. & Schliemann, A. D. (2004). "Ten year olds solving linear equations". For the Learning of Mathematics, 24 (2).
 Brizuela, B. M. & Lara-Roth, S. (2002). "Additive relations and function tables". Journal of mathematical behavior, 20 (3), 309–319.
 Brizuela, B. M., & Sellers-García, M. J. (1999). "School adaptation: A triangular process". American Educational Research Journal, 36 (2), 345–370.
 Brizuela, B. (1997). "Inventions and conventions: A story about capital numbers". For the Learning of Mathematics, 17 (1), 2–6.

References

External links 
 Personal web page at Tufts

Tufts University faculty
Women educational theorists
Harvard Graduate School of Education alumni
Harvard Fellows
Year of birth missing (living people)
Living people
Mathematics educators
21st-century American mathematicians
American women mathematicians
21st-century American women